The House of La Marck was a noble family, which from about 1200 appeared as the counts of Mark.

History
The family history started with Count Adolf I, scion of a cadet branch of the Rhenish Berg dynasty residing at Altena Castle in Westphalia. In the early 13th century Adolf took his residence at his family's estates around Mark, a settlement in present-day Hamm-Uentrop. Adolf had inherited the Mark fortress from his father Count Frederick I of Berg-Altena (d. 1198) together with the older county around Altena and began to call himself count de La Mark.   
  
Originally liensmen of the archbishops of Cologne in the Duchy of Westphalia, the family ruled the County of Mark, an immediate state of the Holy Roman Empire, and, at the height of their powers, the four duchies of Julich, Cleves, Berg and Guelders as well as the County of Ravensberg. Members of the family became bishops in the Prince-Bishoprics of Liège, Münster and Osnabrück, and Archbishops in Cologne. Later collateral lines became dukes of Bouillon, a title which was later inherited by the House of La Tour d'Auvergne, princes of Sedan, dukes of Nevers, counts of Rethel and so forth.

Notable members
 Adolph de la Marck (1288–1344), Prince-Bishop of Liège
 Adolph II of the Marck (died 1347), Count of the Marck, son of Engelbert I of the Marck
 Engelbert III of the Mark (1333–1391), Count of the Marck, son of Count Adolph II
 Adolf III of the Marck (–1394), Prince-Bishop of Münster, later was Archbishop-Elector of Cologne, later was Count of Cleves, later added Count of the Marck
 Engelbert de la Marck (1304–1368), Prince-Bishop of Liège, later was Archbishop-Elector of Cologne
 William I de La Marck (1445–1486), assassinated a Prince-Bishop of Liège, causing a civil war in the prince-bishopric
Érard de La Marck (1472–1538), nephew of William I, was prince-bishop from 1506 till 1538.
Robert II de la Marck, nephew of William I, was Duke of Bouillon, seigneur of Sedan and Fleuranges.
Robert III de la Marck (1491–1537), son of Robert II, was Marshal of France in 1526 and historian.
Robert IV de la Marck (1520–1556) was Duke of Bouillon and Prince of Sedan, and Marshal of France in 1547.
William II de la Marck (1542–1578) was admiral of the Gueux de mer, the so-called 'sea beggars' who fought in the Eighty Years' War (1568–1648). He was the great-grandson of William I de la Marck.
Anne of Cleves, 4th wife of King Henry VIII of England, was a member of this house, daughter of John III.

In 1591 the heiress of one of the collateral lines of the family, Charlotte de la Marck, was married to Henri de La Tour d'Auvergne, Marshal of France. In 1594 Charlotte died without issue, and her claims to Bouillon passed to her husband.

Louis Pierre Engelbert, Comte de la Marck (1674–1750)
Louis Engelbert, Comte de la Marck (1701–1773) He was the last male descendant of the Counts de la Marck, so his title Comte de la Marck was passed on to his grandson through his daughter, Louise-Marguerite, who married Charles Marie Raymond of Arenberg.
Auguste Marie Raymond, Comte de la Marck (1753–1833)

Simplified genealogy

Counts of Mark

 Adolf I (d. 1249), first documented as comes de Marca in 1202
 Engelbert I (d. 1277)
 Eberhard (d. 1308)
 Engelbert II (d. 1328)
 Adolf II (d. 1346), married Margaret of Cleves in 1332
 Engelbert III (d. 1391)
 Adolf III (1334–1394), Count of Cleves from 1368 → see below
 Engelbert (1304–1368), Prince-Bishop of Liège 1345–1364, Archbishop of Cologne 1364–68
 Eberhard I (d. about 1378), Count of Arenberg → see below
 Adolf (1288–1344), Prince-Bishop of Liège 1313–1344

Dukes of Cleves—La Mark

 Adolf III (1334–1394), second son of Adolf II with Margaret of Cleves, Prince-bishop of Münster 1357–1363 and Archbishop of Cologne in 1363, inherited the County of Cleves upon the death of his maternal uncle Count Johann in 1368 and became Count of Mark upon the death of his elder brother Engelbert III in 1391
Adolph I (1373–1448), Duke of Cleves from 1417
Margaret of Cleves, Duchess of Bavaria-Munich (1416–1444)
Catherine of Cleves, Duchess of Guelders (1417–1479)
John I (1419–1481)
John II (1458–1521)
John III (1490–1539), married Maria of Jülich-Berg in 1509, inherited the duchies of Jülich and Berg and the County of Ravensberg upon the death of his father-in-law Duke William IV of Jülich-Berg, ruled the United Duchies of Jülich-Cleves-Berg upon the death of his father in 1521
Sybille (1512–1554), married to Elector John Frederick of Saxony
Anne (1515–1557), married to King Henry VIII of England
William the Rich (1516–1592), married Maria of Habsburg, Archduchess of Austria and daughter of Emperor Ferdinand I, claimed the Duchy of Guelders upon the death of Duke Charles in 1538
Marie Eleonore (1550–1608), married to Albert Frederick, Duke of Prussia
John Frederick (1555–1575)
John William (1562–1609), extinction of the line, followed by the War of the Jülich succession
Amalia (1517–1586)
Engelbert, Count of Nevers (1462–1506)
Elisabeth (1420–1488), Countess of Schwarzburg
Agnes (1422–1446), Queen of Navarre
Adolph of Cleves, Lord of Ravenstein (1425–1492)
Mary (1426–1487), Duchess of Orléans
 Dietrich II (1374–1398)

Counts of Marck—Arenberg

 Eberhard I (d. about 1378) Lord of Arenberg
 Erard II von der Mark, Lord of Sedan & Arenberg
 Johann II von der Mark, Lord of Sedan & Arenberg
 Erard III von der Mark (+ 1496), Lord of Arenberg whose issue will die into the house of Ligne, by the marriage of Marguerite de la Marck-Arenberg with Jean de Ligne
 Robert I de la Marck (+ 1487), Lord of Sedan, chatellain de Bouillon
 Robert II de la Marck (1460–1536), Lord of Sedan, Duke of Bouillon
 Robert III de la Marck (1491–1537), Lord of Sedan, Duke of Bouillon
 Robert IV de la Marck (1520–1556), Duke of Bouillon, Earl of Braine & Maulevrier, Lord of Sedan.
 Henri Robert de la Marck (1539–1574), Duke of Bouillon, sovereign Prince de Sedan,
 Guillaume Robert de la Marck (1563–1588), Pr of Sedan, Duke de Bouillon, Marquess of Cotron
 Charlotte de la Marck (1574–1594), Dss of Bouillon, Pss de Sedan oo Henri de La Tour D'Auvergne
 Érard de La Marck (1472–1538), Prince-bishop of Liège 1506–1538
 William von der Marck Le Sanglier des Ardennes
 Johann I von der Marck, Baron of Lummen
 Johann II von der Marck, Baron of Lummen (1500–1552)
 William II de la Marck, Baron of Lummen, admiral of the Gueux de mer (1542–1578)

See also
 County of Mark (French Comté de La Marck)

Marguerite de La Marck d'Arenberg (1527–1599), princess-countess and sovereign of Arenberg from 1576. Married Jean de Ligne, baron of Barbançon, in 1547. General of the Spanish armies, he was killed at the battle of Heiligerlée in 1568.

References

External links
Genealogy de la Marck on genealogy.euweb.cz :
 
 

 
La Marck
!